Pierre Lorillard may refer to:

 Pierre Abraham Lorillard (1742–1776), tobacconist of New York City
 Pierre Lorillard II (1764–1843), American tobacco manufacturer, industrialist and banker
 Pierre Lorillard III (1796–1867), original developer of Tuxedo Club, one of the nation's early country clubs
 Pierre Lorillard IV (1833–1901), American tobacco manufacturer and thoroughbred race horse owner